The 2016 United States Senate election in Pennsylvania took place on November 8, 2016, to elect a member of the United States Senate to represent the Commonwealth of Pennsylvania, concurrently with the 2016 U.S. presidential election, as well as other elections to the United States Senate in numerous other states and elections to the United States House of Representatives and various state and local elections. The primaries were held on April 26. Incumbent Republican U.S. Senator Pat Toomey was reelected to a second term in a close race, defeating Democratic nominee Katie McGinty and Libertarian Party nominee Edward Clifford. With a margin of 1.43%, this election was the second-closest race of the 2016 Senate election cycle, behind only the election in New Hampshire.

As of 2023, this remains the most recent time that a Republican has been elected to the U.S. Senate from Pennsylvania.

Background 
Five-term Senator Arlen Specter, a longtime moderate Republican, switched to the Democratic Party in April 2009, and ran for reelection in 2010 as a Democrat. He was defeated in the Democratic primary by U.S. Representative and former U.S. Navy three-star admiral Joe Sestak. After a close race, Sestak lost the general election to former U.S. Representative Pat Toomey by 51% to 49%, a margin of 80,229 votes out of almost 4 million cast. Toomey had previously run for the seat in 2004, narrowly losing to Specter in the Republican Primary. Specter later died in 2012.

After the Republicans took control of the Senate following the 2014 Senate elections, the election in Pennsylvania was seen by many as a top target for the Democrats, who hoped to regain their majority. Katie McGinty, who won the Democratic primary, was one of 160 candidates endorsed by Barack Obama. McGinty got her start in politics after winning the Congressional Fellowship of the American Chemical Society, leading to a position with then Senator Al Gore. In 1993  she was appointed deputy assistant and then chair of the White House Council of Environmental Quality under Bill Clinton. She then went on to be appointed head of the Pennsylvania Department of Environmental Protection by Governor Ed Rendell in 2003. McGinty faced 2010 nominee Sestask and Mayor of Braddock, future Lieutenant Governor of Pennsylvania and holder of this Senate seat John Fetterman in the primary.

Republican primary

Candidates

Declared 
 Pat Toomey, incumbent U.S. Senator

Did not file 
 Everett Stern, security intelligence consultant, HSBC whistleblower and candidate for Pennsylvania's 13th congressional district in 2014

Endorsements

Results

Democratic primary

Candidates

Declared 
 John Fetterman, Mayor of Braddock
 Katie McGinty, former chief of staff to Governor Tom Wolf, former Secretary of the Pennsylvania Department of Environmental Protection and candidate for the governorship in 2014
 Joe Sestak, retired navy admiral, former U.S. Representative and nominee for the U.S. Senate in 2010
 Joseph Vodvarka, small business owner and candidate for the U.S. Senate in 2010 and 2012

Did not file 
 Ed Pawlowski, Mayor of Allentown and candidate for governor in 2014

Declined 
 Bob Brady, U.S. Representative and chairman of the Philadelphia Democratic City Committee (endorsed Katie McGinty)
 Chris Carney, former U.S. Representative
 Matt Cartwright, U.S. Representative (endorsed Joe Sestak)
 Kathy Dahlkemper, Erie County Executive and former U.S. Representative (endorsed Katie McGinty)
 Eugene DePasquale, Pennsylvania Auditor General (running for re-election)
 Rich Fitzgerald, Allegheny County Executive (endorsed Katie McGinty)
 David Hickton, United States Attorney for the Western District of Pennsylvania
 Vincent Hughes, state senator (endorsed Katie McGinty)
 Kathleen Kane, Pennsylvania Attorney General
 Rob McCord, former Pennsylvania Treasurer and candidate for the governorship in 2014
 Patrick Murphy, former U.S. Representative and candidate for attorney general in 2012
 Michael Nutter, Mayor of Philadelphia (endorsed Katie McGinty)
 Ed Rendell, former Governor of Pennsylvania (endorsed Katie McGinty)
 Allyson Schwartz, former U.S. Representative and candidate for the governorship in 2014
 Josh Shapiro, chairman of the Montgomery County Board of Commissioners and former state representative (running for attorney general)
 Joe Torsella, United States Representative to the United Nations for Management and Reform and former chairman of the Pennsylvania State Board of Education (running for state treasurer)
 R. Seth Williams, District Attorney of Philadelphia

Endorsements

Debates 
A debate hosted by Carnegie Mellon University's Heinz College in association with the 14th Ward Independent Democratic Club featuring John Fetterman, Katie McGinty, and Joe Sestak occurred on January 31 at Rangos Hall in Jared L. Cohon University Center, Carnegie Mellon University, in Pittsburgh.

A debate hosted by Keystone Progress featuring John Fetterman, Katie McGinty, and Joe Sestak occurred on February 19 at the Hilton Harrisburg, in the Harrisburg Ballroom, in Harrisburg.

Polling

Results

General election

Candidates 
 Edward T. "Ed" Clifford, III (L), accountant
 Katie McGinty (D), former chief of staff to Governor Tom Wolf, former Secretary of the Pennsylvania Department of Environmental Protection and candidate for governor in 2014
 Pat Toomey (R), incumbent

Debates

Predictions

Polling

Results

Overall

By county

See also 
 2016 United States Senate elections

Notes

References

External links 
Official campaign websites
 Pat Toomey (R) for Senate
 Katie McGinty (D) for Senate

2016
Pennsylvania
United States Senate